KADF may refer to:

 Dexter B. Florence Memorial Field (ICAO code KADF)
 KADF-LD, a television station (channel 20) licensed to serve Austin, Texas, United States